Bone Regency is a regency of South Sulawesi, Indonesia. Originally the seat of the Bone state, it joined Indonesia in 1950. The regency covers an area of 4,559.00 km2 and had a population of 717,682 at the 2010 Census and 801,775 at the 2020 Census; the official estimate as at mid 2021 was 806,750. Its main products are seaweed, rice, and fish. The principal town is Watampone, which comprises the three districts of Tanete Riattang Barat, Tanete Riattang and Tanete Riattang Timur within the regency.

History

Bone Regency was home to Bone state, an adat-based Bugis kingdom which was founded by ManurungngE Rimatajang in 1330. It later entered an alliance with the Wajo and Soppeng kingdoms for mutual defence. This alliance became known as LaMumpatue Ri Timurung.

In 1605, during the reign of the tenth king of Bone Latenri Tuppu Matinro Ri Sidenreng, Islam entered Bone and caused a change in local culture, including a renaming of various aspects of the regal system. Bone State later enjoyed a period of prosperity in the middle of the 17th century.

In May 1950, the people held demonstrations in Watampone against the royalty and Bone's membership in the State of East Indonesia. This caused the sultan to step down and join Indonesia.

Geography
Bone is located on the east coast of South Sulawesi.

Bone is surrounded by Wajo to the north, Sinjai to the south, Soppeng, Maros, Pangkkajene, and Barru to the west, and the Gulf of Bone to the east, where it has a sea border with Sulawesi Tenggara.

The climate of Bone is tropical, with the wet season from April to September and the dry season from October to March.

Demographics
According to a 2010 census, Bone Regency had 717,268 residents, consisting 341,335
males and 375,933 females. This gave a sex ratio of 90.80 for the regency, or 91 males for every 100 females. It displayed a population growth rate of 0.67% per annum for the 2000-2010 period. At the 2010 census, Bone Regency had 801,775 residents, consisting 391,682
males and 410,093 females.

The majority of residents of Bone Regency are Muslim, with numerous mosques and places for studying Islam. There are also some churches in Watampone.

Administrative districts 
Bone Regency in 2020 (as in 2010) comprised 27 administrative Districts (Kecamatan), tabulated below with their areas and their populations at the 2010 Census and 2020 Census, together with the official estimates as at mid 2021. The table also includes the locations of the district administrative centres, the number of administrative villages (rural desa and urban kelurahan) within each district, and its postal code(s).

Notes: (a) except the villages of Biru (post code 92714), Cenrana (post code 92754) and Palakka (post code 92761). (b) except the village of Kading (post code 90225).

Coat of arms
The coat of arms of Bone consists of a blue shield with a harrow, anchor, unsheathed kris, rice, cotton plant, and - at the bottom of the shield - the words Kabupaten Bone in red text on a white banner. The harrow and rice stand for the agricultural history of the area. The anchor signifies Bone's nautical prowess, while its symmetry and location in the middle of the shield represents rationality. The kris and red text signify bravery, while the cotton plant represents the Bone people's struggle for independence. The white banner stands for purity and holiness.

Economy
The majority of Bone residents are farmers, commercial gardeners, and fishermen. In the area near the Gulf of Boni, seaweed, crabs, shrimp, and milkfish are the main source of income. Seaweed 
production averages 3,821.5 tonnes per annum, while catches of shrimp, crabs, and milkfish average 4,318 tonnes, 2,061 tonnes, and 4.964 tonnes per annum each. Catches of other fish, mainly tuna, average 73,763.5 tonnes per annum.

Transportation
Bone's sea transportation is handled by five harbours, a larger one located in East Taneteriattang named Bajoe and four smaller ones.

References
Footnotes

Bibliography
 
 
 
 
 
 

Regencies of South Sulawesi